The International Ski Federation (FIS) Alpine World Cup tour is the premier circuit for alpine skiing competition. The inaugural season launched in January 1967, and the 2016 season marked the 50th consecutive year for the FIS. This World Cup season began on 24 October 2015, in Sölden, Austria, and concluded in Saint Moritz, Switzerland on 20 March 2016. The World Ski Championship, a biennial event, did not interrupt this competitive season, and the upcoming World Championships were held Saint Moritz, Switzerland in February 2017

Men 
Summary

By late December 2015, the season had seen year-ending injuries to two top skiers. Austrian Matthias Mayer suffered severe spinal damage in the downhill competition at Gröden in Val Gardena, Italy, and German Josef Ferstl damaged his knee during training in Santa Caterina, Italy on the Downhill course. Despite his broken back, Mayer is optimistic about returning for a 2017 World Cup try following his much debated crash. During the crash that injured Mayer, another World Cup first took place when the 'body airbag' he was wearing inflated. The new protective gear, now worn by many skiers, has never been deployed during a World Cup competition prior to this. The system is designed to minimize severe thoracic injuries, like the one Mayer suffered, by deploying quickly during tumbles and mishap. Emergency responders could see that the "airbag" had engaged as designed before they even knew about the broken spine. It has not been determined if the "protective gear" prevented worse injury, promoted the injury that was received, or had no effect in the matter.

An odd incident marred the early season as a small, remotely-piloted camera helicopter, operated by broadcast media, nearly foiled Marcel Hirscher's podium effort by crashing during his run and narrowly missing him. A day after the incident, the International Ski Federation adopted the policy of banning remotely-piloted vehicles from flying over their events as a matter of safety and concern for the welfare of their athletes, staff and viewers. Senior Race Director Markus Waldner stated his displeasure with the occurrence and insisted that the ban will remain in effect as long as he is on the job. The newly introduced Parallel Giant Slalom  event at Alta Badia, Italy, was a relatively short Giant Slalom course that pitted the men against one another in a modified bracket-reduction format from thirty-two 1st run skiers, to sixteen 2nd bracket skiers that eventually dwindled to just four final round racers. The Snow Queen Trophy slalom planned for Sljême, Croatia was cancelled and diverted to Santa Caterina, Italy for lack of snow, while the early season slalom in Levi, Finland suffered similar conditions, but could not find a home to reschedule to in the very busy year.

By mid-season, the World Cup overall leader, as well as Downhill and Super-G discipline leader, Aksel Lund Svindal was out following a crash during the Downhill at Kitzbühel. He suffered a season-ending injury to his right knee and needed immediate surgery. Georg Streitberger of Austria also suffered a season-ending knee injury in the same race, which was ended after only thirty skiers left the starting gate. Poor visibility, and the number of serious crashes that were occurring, prompted race officials to halt the event at the minimum skiers required to have it qualify as a complete event.

Calendar

Rankings 

Overall 

Downhill 

Super G 

Giant slalom 

Slalom 

Alpine combined

Women 
Summary

The first part of the season produced many injuries to several top skiers. Sara Hector severely injured her knee  in Giant Slalom, during the competition in Åre, Sweden, and two event champions from the previous season, Lindsey Vonn and Mikaela Shiffrin missed several events due to recent incidents. Vonn missed the October and November events to continue rehabilitating from last year's season-ending injury, and from a recent dog bite from one of her pets. Shiffrin dropped-out in mid-December to recuperate from an injury suffered during practice at Åre. Shiffrin's recovery was not immediate and she missed the heart of the race season, however, she returned to the circuit in mid-February and promptly dominated the competition. The lack of snowy weather eliminated the women's race weekend at St. Anton's, Austria, two weeks before the planned event. Officials recognized that they did not have enough snow on the ground, and that they did not have the ability to generate enough man-made snow for safe racing. The events were quickly relocated to Zauchensee, Austria, for the same dates. A few days later, officials cancelled the Snow Queen Trophy slalom planned at Sljême, Croatia. The stop was the only one planned for Croatia this season, and was one of the few joint stops on tour where male and female teammates crossed paths during the year. The slalom event was quickly rescheduled to Santa Caterina, Italy on consecutive days.

The middle of the season saw a significant reshuffle of many of the events throughout The Alps. Six events were cancelled in January for unseasonably warm weather and insufficient snow. The events were promptly repositioned to snowier venues further down the schedule. In contrast, mid-February saw a few events abandoned due to soft and excessive snow, over two meters in one instance... a significant safety concern for the high speed disciplines. At the end of the February, during the Super-G in Soldeu, Vonn, having just returned from injury seven weeks earlier, crashed again while leading near the end of her run. She raced the next day in the Combined event, earned a few points, then ended her season on Monday after a complete medical evaluation in Barcelona revealed several hairline fractures in her knee. At the time of her departure, she had already won the Downhill discipline for the season and was leading the Overall, Super-G and Combined disciplines.

Notable skiers that did not participate this year include: Anna Fenninger, the defending World Cup champion who was forced to skip the season due to a serious knee injury. Tina Maze, last season's runner-up decided to take a short hiatus during the 2016 season before permanently deciding to continue, or end, her World Cup career. Champion skier Julia Mancuso decided to opt for hip surgery in November, 2015, instead of rushing back after non-surgical therapy failed to give her the full recovery she had hoped for. Her stated goal is to get back to winning form in time to qualify for the 2018 Winter Olympics in South Korea.

Calendar

Rankings 

Overall

Downhill 

Super G

Giant slalom 

Slalom 

Alpine combined

Nation team event

Nations Cup 

Overall

Men

Women

Prize money 

Prize Money Earned

Top-5 Men

Top-5 Women

References

External links 

 

FIS Alpine Ski World Cup
World Cup
World Cup